Howard Charles Slade (29 January 1891 – 7 April 1971) was a professional footballer, who played for Aston Villa, Huddersfield Town, Middlesbrough and Darlington. While at Huddersfield he won the 1921–22 FA Cup and the 1922 FA Charity Shield.

Slade was working as a  scout for Crystal Palace when manager Ronnie Rooke resigned, in 1950. Palace appointed Slade as joint-manager with long-serving player, and Rooke's assistant, Fred Dawes. However the club had a poor 1950–51 season and early into the next campaign Dawes and Slade were removed from their positions.

Slade reverted to his position as a scout and remained with Palace until 1955.

References

1891 births
1971 deaths
English footballers
Sportspeople from Bath, Somerset
Association football midfielders
English Football League players
Aston Villa F.C. players
Huddersfield Town A.F.C. players
Middlesbrough F.C. players
Darlington F.C. players
English football managers
Örgryte IS managers
Folkestone F.C. players
Crystal Palace F.C. managers
FA Cup Final players